Polionemobius is a genus of crickets in the subfamily Nemobiinae. Species can be found in Asia.

Taxonomy
The Orthoptera Species File lists the following species:
Polionemobius annulicornis Li, He & Liu, 2010 
Polionemobius batavicus (Gorochov, 1984) 
Polionemobius decipiens (Gorochov, 1984) 
Polionemobius flavoantennalis (Shiraki, 1911)
Polionemobius mikado (Shiraki, 1911)
Polionemobius modestus Gorochov, 1994
Polionemobius pulchellus (Gorochov, 1984)
Polionemobius taprobanensis (Walker, 1869) - type species (as Trigonidium taprobanense Walker)
Polionemobius tarbinskyi Gorochov, 1986
Polionemobius yunnanus Liu & Shi, 2014

References

Ground crickets